Robert Anthony (Casper) Asbjornson (June 19, 1909 – January 21, 1970) was a catcher in Major League Baseball who played for the Boston Red Sox (-) and Cincinnati Reds (-). Asbjornson batted and threw right-handed. He was born in Concord, Massachusetts.

Asbjornson was 19 years old when he debuted with the Boston Red Sox in 1928, being one of seven catchers used by the Red Sox in an unsuccessful attempt to replace retired Grover Hartley. Later, he saw more action with the Cincinnati Reds as a backup for Clyde Sukeforth and Ernie Lombardi in part of two seasons.

In a four-season career, Asbjornson was a .235 hitter with one home run and 27 RBI in 97 games.

Asbjornson died in Williamsport, Pennsylvania, at the age of 60.

External links

1909 births
1970 deaths
Major League Baseball catchers
Boston Red Sox players
Cincinnati Reds players
Akron Tyrites players
Baltimore Orioles (IL) players
Dallas Steers players
Fort Worth Cats players
Pine Bluff Judges players
Pittsfield Hillies players
Nashville Vols players
Toledo Mud Hens players
Waco Cubs players
Williamsport Grays players
Baseball players from Massachusetts
People from Concord, Massachusetts
Sportspeople from Williamsport, Pennsylvania
Sportspeople from Middlesex County, Massachusetts